Sathya Studios (formerly Neptune Studios) was an Indian film studio based in Chennai, Tamil Nadu. It was one of the oldest film studios and was formerly known as "Neptune Studio". The studio was bought by former Indian actor and former Chief Minister of Tamil Nadu M. G. Ramachandran and renamed as Sathya Studios.

History

as Lalitha Cinetone and National Theaters Limited 
Originally started by C. V. Raman when he leased from Nawab of Arcot, a large tract of land of 25-odd acres  with some superstructures in Adayar with Greenways road on the north and the Adayar River on the south bordering the Broody Castle. The monthly rental was Rs. 150 and was intended as a studio floor for "Lalitha Cinetone". But the production company did not produce any movies due to financial troubles and the premises was later transferred to and  transferred the studio to C. V. Raman's newly floated company "National Theaters Limited" with Kasi Chettiar and R. Prakash as partners. The first film to come out of the studio was silent film `Vishnu Leela' in 1932 directed by R. Prakash. Later NTL too would plunge into problems and C. V. Raman would launch another production company "Meenakshi Cinetone" to which the studio premises was part of.

as Meenakshi Cinetone
Meenakshi Cinetone was founded by C. V. Raman with noted Indian businessman and philanthropist AL. RM. His other venture  Motion Picture Producers  Combine. (a.k.a. MPCC) would become Gemini Studios under S. S. Vasan.
In 1934, the studio released the Tamil talkie movie "Pavalakodi" marking the debuts of M. K. Thyagaraja Bhagavathar, the first superstar of South India, and its director lawyer-turned-filmmaker, K. Subramaniam  and the star-actress, S.D. Subbulakshmi.

Under Jupiter Pictures
The movie was renamed to "Neptune Studios" and in the mid-1950s the Coimbatore-based Jupiter Pictures leased the studio and relocated their base to Chennai after the lease of Central Studios were over and its owners ceased movie production.

As Sathya Studios
Neptune Studios was later acquired by the family of M. G. Ramachandran  who renamed it Sathya Studios Private Limited. Now a college for Women in the name of Dr. MGR Janaki College of Arts and Science for Women functions there.

References

External links
 The Hindu : Studios — the scene of action
 The Hindu : Fascinating journey to fame

Indian film studios
Film production companies based in Chennai
Indian companies established in 1932